Tarvonsaari is a neighbourhood of Rauma, Finland. It is located in the centre of the city.

References

Neighbourhoods of Rauma, Finland